John Bond Reid (February 25, 1896 – December 21, 1963) was an American football player and coach of football, basketball, and baseball. He served as head football coach at North Texas State Teachers College, now the University of North Texas, from 1925 to 1928, compiling a record of 16–18–3. Reid was also the head basketball coach at North Texas State Teachers  from 1924 to 1929 and at Texas A&M University from 1929 to 1935, amassing a career college basketball record of 144–84. In addition, he was the head baseball coach at North Texas State Teachers College from 1925 to 1926, tallying a mark 7–11. He died of prostate cancer in 1963. He is interred at Magnolia Cemetery in Woodville.

Head coaching record

Football

References

External links
 

1896 births
1963 deaths
Basketball coaches from Texas
Baylor Bears football players
Deaths from cancer in Texas
Deaths from prostate cancer
North Texas Mean Green baseball coaches
North Texas Mean Green football coaches
North Texas Mean Green men's basketball coaches
People from Woodville, Texas
Players of American football from Texas
Texas A&M Aggies men's basketball coaches